A102, A.102 or A-102 may refer to :
 A102 road (England), a road connecting Clapton in the north London Borough of Hackney and Kidbrooke in the south London Borough of Greenwich
 AS-102, the 1964 second Saturn rocket launch to carry a boilerplate Apollo spacecraft
 Aero A.102, a 1934 Czechoslovakian fighter aircraft